Padworth College is a co-educational private senior school in Padworth, Berkshire.

External links

Berkshire History: Padworth House

1963 establishments in the United Kingdom
Country houses in Berkshire
Private schools in West Berkshire District
Educational institutions established in 1963